Condylomata lata or condyloma latum, is a cutaneous condition characterized by wart-like lesions on the genitals. They are generally symptoms of the secondary phase of syphilis, caused by the spirochete, Treponema pallidum.

They tend to develop in warm, moist sites of the genitals and perineum. These lesions hold a high accumulation of spirochetes and are highly infectious. Complete resolution of the lesions is spontaneous and occurs after a few days to many weeks, where it is either resolved completely or enters the tertiary phase, defined by a latent state.

See also 
 Chromobacteriosis infection
 List of cutaneous conditions

References 

Bacterium-related cutaneous conditions